Fish Hawk is a 1979 Canadian drama film directed by Donald Shebib. The screenplay was written by Blanche Hanalis, based on the novel Old Fish Hawk by Mitchell Jayne. The film was nominated for several Genie Awards including for direction, editing and best performance by a foreign actor. It was also entered into the 11th Moscow International Film Festival.

The film sold to US TV for $1.5 million.

Plot
A young boy befriends a Native American man who has become an alcoholic after the death of his wife and children from small pox.

Principal cast

Filming locations
 Kleinburg, Ontario and Forks of the Credit, Ontario

Critical reception
Vincent Canby of The New York Times did not give high praise to the film:

References

External links 
 
 

1979 drama films
1979 films
Embassy Pictures films
English-language Canadian films
Films about Native Americans
Films about alcoholism
Canadian coming-of-age drama films
Films directed by Donald Shebib
1970s coming-of-age drama films
1970s English-language films
1970s Canadian films